The 2017–18 Stanford Cardinal women's basketball team represented Stanford University during the 2017–18 NCAA Division I women's basketball season. The Cardinal, led by thirty-second year head coach Tara VanDerveer, played their home games at the Maples Pavilion and were members of the Pac-12 Conference. They finished the season 24–11, 14–3 in Pac-12 play to finish in second place. They advanced to the championship game of the Pac-12 women's tournament where they lost to Oregon. They received an at-large the NCAA women's tournament where they defeated Gonzaga and Florida Gulf Coast in the first and second rounds before losing to Louisville in the sweet sixteen.

Roster

Schedule

|-
!colspan=9 style="background:#; color:white;"| Exhibition

|-
!colspan=9 style="background:#; color:white;"| Non-conference regular season

|-
!colspan=9 style="background:#; color:white;"| Pac-12 regular season

|-
!colspan=9 style="background:#;"| Pac-12 Women's Tournament

|-
!colspan=9 style="background:#;"| NCAA Women's Tournament

The February 25th game versus Washington State cougars was cancelled due to the death of the Cougars' director of strength and conditioning David Lang.

Rankings
2017–18 NCAA Division I women's basketball rankings

See also
2017–18 Stanford Cardinal men's basketball team

References

Stanford Cardinal women's basketball seasons
Stanford
Stanford